Walter Wilczynski (born September 18, 1952 in Trenton, New Jersey, died June 9, 2020 in Atlanta, Georgia) is an American ethologist, neuroscientist, and professor at Georgia State University (GSU) in Atlanta, Georgia.

Early life and education
Wilczynski was born in Trenton, New Jersey. He received his bachelor's degree in both biology and psychology from Lehigh University in 1974, after which he received his Ph.D. in neuroscience from the University of Michigan in 1978. He then completed his postdoc at the Section of Neurobiology and Behavior at Cornell University, where he worked in the lab of Robert Capranica.

Career
In 1983, Wilczynski joined the faculty of the University of Texas at Austin as an assistant professor of psychology. He remained on the faculty of the University of Texas at Austin until 2005, when he joined the faculty of GSU. While at the University of Texas at Austin, he helped found the Institute for Neuroscience and the interdisciplinary neuroscience Ph.D. program there. At GSU, he became a professor of psychology upon joining their faculty in 2005. He has been the co-director of Research and Academic Programs at GSU's Center for Behavioral Neuroscience since 2005, and has been the director of GSU's Neuroscience Institute since it was formed in 2008. In 2013, he received a five-year, $499,209 grant from the National Science Foundation to create the Sociogenomics Initiative Research Coordination Network, which unites researchers in the U.S. and Canada working in the field of sociogenomics.

Research
Wilczynski's research focuses on the study of neural origins of social behavior in animals. This research draws upon multiple separate disciplines, including neuroanatomy, neuroendocrinology, and neurophysiology. Animals whose behavior he has studied include multiple frog species, such as cricket frogs, American green tree frogs, and túngara frogs.

Awards and memberships
Wilczynski is a member of the American Association for the Advancement of Science and Sigma Xi, among other organizations. He was a Fulbright U.S. Scholar to the University of Chile in 2016.

Editorial activities
Wilczynski was the editor-in-chief of Brain, Behavior and Evolution from 1999 to 2009. He is also a past editorial board member of the Journal of Zoology (2007–2010) and a former associate editor of Animal Behaviour (1997–2000).

References

External links
Faculty page

Living people
Ethologists
American neuroscientists
Georgia State University faculty
People from Trenton, New Jersey
Academic journal editors
Lehigh University alumni
University of Michigan faculty
University of Texas at Austin faculty
1952 births